Christopher Sembroski (born August 28, 1979) is an American data engineer, Air Force veteran, and commercial astronaut, currently living in Gig Harbor, Washington, United States.  He flew to orbit on Inspiration4, a private spaceflight funded by billionaire Jared Isaacman.

Sembroski is a Blue Origin employee and was a crew member on the Inspiration4 mission. The spaceflight position was given to Sembroski by his friend Kyle Hippchen, as he was unable to accept the prize because he exceeded the weight limit of the Dragon vehicle.

Sembroski has long had an interest in space, being an amateur astronomer and rocketeer. Sembroski received the call sign "Hanks" during training.

He is featured on the cover of a Time magazine double issue with the rest of the crew of Inspiration4 in August 2021.

Career
Sembroski grew up in Kannapolis, North Carolina. During college, Sembroski volunteered for ProSpace, a nonprofit organization advocating for private spaceflight. Sembroski also was a counselor at Space Camp in Huntsville, Alabama which promotes science, technology, engineering, and math to children and teenagers. After college, Sembroski joined the United States Air Force as an Electro-Mechanical Technician stationed at Malmstrom Air Force Base in Great Falls, MT. Sembroski worked as a data engineer for Lockheed-Martin. He has sinced moved to work as an avionics engineer at Blue Origin.

He is a member of the Association of Space Explorers.

References

External links

 SpaceFacts.de: Tourist Biography: Christopher Sembroski
 Inspiration4 Crew Page

1979 births
Living people
Space tourists
United States Air Force airmen
Inspiration4